Jarmosht or Jarmasht, also rendered as Garmosht or Jarmast, may refer to:
 Garmosht, Khonj County
 Jarmosht-e Bala, Jahrom County
 Jarmosht-e Pain, Jahrom County